Francisco Savín (18 November 1929 – 26 January 2018) was a Mexican conductor and composer. Born in Mexico City, he studied composition under Rodolfo Halffter and conducting under Luis Herrera de la Fuente. He conducted the Xalapa Symphony Orchestra from 1963 to 1967, and from 1984 to 1986.

References

1929 births
2018 deaths
Mexican conductors (music)
Male conductors (music)
Mexican composers
Mexican male composers
Musicians from Mexico City